The 2007 Budweiser Shootout, was a NASCAR Nextel Cup Series race held on February 10, 2007, at Daytona International Speedway in Daytona Beach, Florida. Contested over 70 laps on the 2.5-mile (4.0 km) asphalt superspeedway, it was the exhibition race of the 2007 NASCAR Nextel Cup Series season. Tony Stewart of Joe Gibbs Racing won the race.

Background
Daytona International Speedway is a race track in Daytona Beach, Florida that is one of six superspeedways to hold NASCAR races, the others being Auto Club Speedway, Indianapolis Motor Speedway, Michigan International Speedway, Pocono Raceway and Talladega Superspeedway. The track also features two other layouts that utilize portions of the primary high speed tri-oval, such as a  sports car course and a  motorcycle course. The track's  infield includes the  Lake Lloyd, which has hosted powerboat racing. The speedway is owned and operated by International Speedway Corporation.

Summary
This non-points race, which involves the previous season's pole winners and past Shootout winners, was held on Saturday, February 10, at Daytona International Speedway officially kicking off Speedweeks.  Two-time series champion Tony Stewart took the checkered flag, but as he did so, Dale Earnhardt Jr. made contact with the back bumper of Elliott Sadler, causing a five-car wreck less than 1000 feet from the start/finish line.

One of the biggest headlines for the Shootout was that it would be the first Nextel Cup race to feature Toyota, and in the draw for starting spots, Dale Jarrett, a Toyota driver, drew the pole position.  However, he slid to the back within four laps of the start, and stayed there for most of the race.  Brian Vickers, the other Toyota driver in the event, started fourth, and though he went back-and-forth through the field, finished eighth.

Race results

Race Statistics
 Time of race: 1:03:12
 Average Speed: 
 Pole Speed: drew for pole
 Cautions: 2 for 5 laps
 Margin of Victory: under caution
 Lead changes: 12

References

Budweiser Shootout
Budweiser Shootout
NASCAR races at Daytona International Speedway
February 2007 sports events in the United States